Trystan Owain Hughes (born 1972) is a Christian theologian, historian and author. He is noted for his work in church history, theology and spirituality.

Biography

Hughes was born in Penmaenmawr, North Wales, UK, and is a fluent Welsh language speaker. He attained a Master of Theology from Oxford University and a PhD from Bangor University, Wales. He was Chaplain at Cardiff University and was head of Theology at Trinity University College, Carmarthen, Wales. He is now Vicar at Christ Church, Roath Park in Cardiff, also working as director of theological studies at St. Padarn's Institute.

He is a regular contributor to BBC Radio 2's Pause for Thought, and to programmes on BBC Radio Cymru and BBC Radio Wales. He is a member of the Church in Wales's governing body and sits on the theological commission that assists the bench of Welsh Bishops. He lectures in theology at Cardiff University and St Michael's Theological College, Llandaff.

Hughes' PhD explored the history of the Welsh churches in the twentieth century, and his subsequent academic work has been published in academic journals, and collections of articles. He has also contributed a number of articles to the Welsh Academy Encyclopaedia of Wales (UWP, 2008). He has presented at a range of conferences including at Edinburgh University 1999; University of Stirling 1999; Bryn Mawr College, Philadelphia 2000; Sydney University 2001; University of Northumbria 2001 and 2002; and Chicago 2003.

As Anglican Chaplain at Cardiff University he worked to promote ecumenical and inter-faith dialogue amongst students. He ran a successful inter-faith cafe, and worked to promote understanding and tolerance between students of different denominations and faiths.

Hughes's accessible spirituality, reflected in his book Finding Hope and Meaning in Suffering, its website, lectures, talks, and retreats, has made him popular with the religious and secular media.

Bibliography

References 

Welsh Anglicans
Welsh theologians
Alumni of the University of Oxford
Alumni of Bangor University
Academics of Cardiff University
People from Conwy County Borough
1972 births
Living people
20th-century Welsh theologians
21st-century Welsh theologians